The 2001 Brisbane Broncos season was the fourteenth in the club's history. They competed in the NRL's 2001 Telstra Premiership and finished the regular season in fifth position, going on to play in the finals and coming within one match of the grand final.

Season summary 
As the 2000 season's premiers, the Brisbane Broncos travelled to England in January to contest the 2001 World Club Challenge. The players wore black armbands during the match in memory of the club's co-founder Paul "Porky" Morgan who had died from a heart attack the previous day.
Brent Tate made his NRL debut for the Broncos this season.
The 2001 NRL season was unusual for the Broncos in that they were unable to string together more than three wins at any time during the season. They lost six games from rounds 20 to 25, at the time the club's worst-ever losing streak. However they finished in 5th position and made it as far as the preliminary final which they lost to Parramatta, in what was a rematch of the preliminary final from the previous season in which the Broncos won 16–10.

Match results 

 *Game following a State of Origin match

Ladder

Scorers

Honours

League 
 Nil

Club 
 Player of the year: Shane Webcke
 Rookie of the year: Carl Webb
 Back of the year: Darren Lockyer
 Forward of the year: Shane Webcke
 Club man of the year: Ben Ikin

References 

Brisbane Broncos seasons
Brisbane Broncos season